Marisba is a monotypic snout moth genus. Its one species, Marisba undulifera, was described by Francis Walker in 1863, and is known from Brazil (including Rio de Janeiro, the type location).

References

External links
 
 
 

Taxa named by Francis Walker (entomologist)
Galleriinae
Monotypic moth genera
Moths of South America
Pyralidae genera